Naidich is a surname. Notable people with the surname include:

Martín Naidich (born 1990), Argentine swimmer
Susana Naidich (born 1932), Argentine singer, musicologist, phonologist, voice teacher, and speech-language pathologist